The Catholicos of India, earlier known as the  Catholicos of the East is an ecclesiastical office in the Syriac Orthodox Church. He is the Catholicos and spiritual leader and regional head of the Jacobite Syrian Christian Church, the Indian body of the Syriac Orthodox Church, and functions at an ecclesiastical rank second only to the Syriac Orthodox Patriarch of Antioch, and his name is commemorated in liturgy throughout the Syriac Orthodox Archdioceses in India. The position was renamed as ‘Catholicos of India’ in 2002, in accordance with its actual jurisdiction.

The current Catholicos of India is Baselios Thomas I, who was consecrated in 2002.

Catholicos/Maphrian 

The word is a transliteration of the Greek καθολικός, pl. καθολικοί, meaning concerning the whole, universal or general. It was a title that existed in the Roman Empire where Government representative who was in charge of a large area was called ‘Catholicos’. The Churches later started to use this term for their Chief Bishops.

‘Maphriyono’ (Maphrian) is derived from the Syriac word 'afri', "to make fruitful", or "one who gives fecundity". This title be used exclusively for the head of the Syriac Orthodox Church in the East. From the mid 13th century onwards, a few occupants of the Maphrianate were referred also as ‘Catholicos’, but the title never came into extensive usage.

In the 20th century when this office of the Maphrianate under the Holy Apostolic See of Antioch was re-established in India, the chief of the local church assumed the title ‘Catholicos of the East’, but his jurisdiction was restricted to India in the East. Later in the 21st century (in 2002) the Maphrianate was renamed to 'Maphrianate of India' and the Maphriano Assumed the title 'Catholicose/Maphriano of India' as per constitution of the church in India, officially known as "Catholicos of the East" as the Syrian Orthodox Constitution.

In the Syriac Orthodox Context both Catholicose and Maphriano have the same meaning and refer to the same office.

Origins and development of the Catholicate in India 

The Universal Syrian Orthodox Synod decided to re-establish the Maphrianate of the East after the reconciliation movement gathered momentum in the 1950s and culminated in the consecration of Augen I as catholicose by the Episcopal Synod presided over by Patriarch Ignatius Jacob III. The church later split again in 1975 as Mar Augen I argued that the Catholicos is equal to the Patriarch and Malankara Syrian Church have ecclesiastical throne of Thomas the Apostle and that he is seated on that throne against reunification decisions. The Patriarch Mor Ignatius Jacob III in his bull numbered 203 claimed that Thomas the Apostle did not establish any ecclesiastical Apostolic Throne in Malankara but the Catholicos Augen I and  his group refused and not accept this claim. So the Patriarch excommunicate the Catholicos and his group is known as the Malankara Orthodox Church from the Syriac Orthodox Church.

For the people favoring the Patriarch's supremacy, the Maphrian consecrated  by Patriarch Jacob III in 1975. Mor Baselios Paulose II was the Second Catholicose/Maphrian of Jacobite Syrian Orthodox Church. After Mor Baselios Paulose II's demise in 1996 the office remained vacant for several years to accommodate reconciliation attempts, which were unsuccessful.

In 2002, the Catholicos Baselios Thomas I was consecrated by Patriarch Ignatius Zakka I Iwas to be the head of the Malankara Archdiocese of Syriac Orthodox Church in India known as "Jacobite Syrian Church". His Beatitiude's official title was made Catholicos of India, due to the its jurisdiction was in India of the East. As a result, since the time of Baselios Thomas I, the title of the Catholocose/Maphriano was modified to Catholicose/Maphriano Of India of the East of Jacobite Syrian Church Constitution as the jurisdiction of India unlike his predecessor Baselios Augen I and Baselios Paulose II, who was titled Catholicose of the East thought his jurisdiction was only India. The Patriarch of Antioch Ignatius Jacob III consecrated Paulose Mor Philoxenos as the Catholicose of the East under the title Baselios Paulose II. He functions at an ecclesiastical rank second only to the Patriarch, having the privilege to preside over the consecration of new patriarchs. The Catholicos is welcomed brotherly alongside the Patriarch at ecclesiastical and ecumenical functions, and hosted the Patriarch during a state visit to India in 2005.

This Catholicate is headquartered at Puthencruz, Kerala, India. The Catholicos of India presides over the Malankara Jacobite Syrian Christian Association, the legal entity of Jacobite parishes in Malankara that unequivocally supports remaining within the Antiochian Patriarchate.

The Catholicos is not authorized to consecrate Holy Chrism independently without Permission of the Patriarch because of Hudaya Canon(Accepted only the Manuscript either not catholic canon or Malankara orthodox Church canon is called the Paris canon) of the Holy fathers. The jurisdiction of the Syriac Orthodox Catholicos of the East in India only, although he is often invited to preside over Syriac Orthodox functions abroad as an Indian, officially Catholicos of the East as per Syriac Orthodox Church Constitution.

Authority 

As the head of the catholicate of Syriac Orthodox Church in India, the Catholicos presides over the Holy Episcopal Synod of Jacobite Syrian Christian Church and second position in Syrian Orthodox Church after the Patriarch. The Catholicos gets respects from the whole over nations and has greater position above any other honorable Metropolitans of the Syrian Orthodox Church according to constitution of the Syrian Orthodox Church and Jacobite Syrian Orthodox Church.

Article of autonomy of the Catholicos 
Article freedom according to the constitution of the Syriac Orthodox Church of 1998 grand permission by Patriarch Ignatius Zaka I Iwas

Article 8
 Second rank after the Patriarch.
 As respect of Saint Peter Supremacy of the Syriac Orthodox Church of India as like constitution of the Mulanthuruthy Padiyola.
 He is elected by only Metropolitans under the Jurisdiction of the Catholicate See.
Must obey Catholicos by priests, deacons and all the people.
Must proclaimed her "Name" after patriarch during Holy Mass and canonical prayers
His name should be mentioned at every Syrian Churches where he attends the prayer.
His title is "Catholicos of the East and Metropolitan of Malankara"

Article 15
H.H Patriarch ordains the lawfully elected Catholicos and Metropolitans, and consecrates the Holy Chrism.
According to the Hudaya Canon of Syriac Orthodox Church.

Article 22 
Removal of Catholicos, Metropolitans and acceptance of their resignations
As resignation of Holy Episcopal Synod of Universal Syriac Orthodox Church.

Article 27 
The Patriarch can communicate Catholicos personally
The Patriarch can address only "Your Beatitude" and "Our Brother"
"Your" Beatitude as for the Metropolitan's, Arch priest, Clergy, Deacons and Laymen.
"Our" Brother(Our - "unequally Oriental Orthodox Church and also, who respect and communicate the patriarch") for the Great Majesty Patriarch of the Syriac Orthodox Church.

Article 40
His Beatitude the Catholicos will participate to electing the patriarch, but may not be elected.
Because of "His Beatitude" has separate Geography according to the Syriac Orthodox Church Constitution and their Constitution and either constitution and also have constitution for churches according to the freedom of nation, as the agreement of the Holy Episcopal Synod and regional Episcopal Synod.

Article 48
His Beatitude shall celebrate the Holy Eucharist otherwise the Patriarchal locum tenes or most senior Metropolitans whatever whole Metropolitans joined this celebration during the holy Liturgy after the inauguration of the elected patriarch.

Catholicate See
Archdiocese of Malankara
Simhasana Churches
Malankara Syriac Knanaya Archdiocese
Malankara Archdiocese of North America
Diocese outside Kerala
Diocese outside India
Kuwait, Qatar, Bahrain, UAE, Oman, Saudi Arabia, Yemen
Australia, New Zealand, United Kingdom, Canada
Singapore, Malaysia
Authonomous Diocese
Honavar Mission
E.A.E Churches
The Syrian Orthodox Church respects the Catholicate See and mentioned name of "His Beatitude" on holy Eucharist and other canonical prayers who under direct jurisdiction of holy church according to the constitution.

List of Maphrians/Catholicos

List of Catholicoi of India
1. Augen I (1964-1975)
 Baselios Augen I was Consecrated as the Maphrian/Catholicos and Malankara Metropolitan of Syriac Orthodox Church by Ignatius Jacob III, Patriarch of Antioch in 1964. He was later  deposed in 1975 by Ignatius Jacob III.
2. Paulose II (1975–1996)
 Baselios Paulose II was Consecrated as the Maphrian/Catholicos Malankara Metropolitan and of Syriac Orthodox Church by Ignatius Jacob III, Patriarch of Antioch.
vacant (1996–2002)
3. Thomas I (2002–present)
 Baselios Thomas I was Consecrated as the Maphrian/Catholicos Metropolitan Trustee and of Syriac Orthodox Church by Ignatius Zakka I, Patriarch of Antioch.

See also 
 Oriental Orthodoxy
 List of Maphrians
 Maphrian
 Catholicos of the East and Malankara Metropolitan
 List of Syriac Orthodox Patriarchs of Antioch

References

Sources
 

Syriac Orthodox Church bishops
Jacobite Syrian Christian Church